USS Congress may refer to:

, was a galley built on Lake Champlain, which served as flagship in the Battle of Valcour Island
, was a 28-gun frigate built under authority of an act of the Second Continental Congress dated 13 December 1775
, was a 38-gun sailing frigate launched in 1799 and in service periodically until she was broken up in 1834
, was a 52-gun frigate launched in 1841 and destroyed by the ironclad CSS Virginia in 1862
, was a screw sloop in commission from 1870 to 1876
, was a patrol vessel in commission from 1918 to 1919
, a proposed  guided missile frigate

United States Navy ship names